Clifford Grey (5 January 1887 – 25 September 1941) was an English songwriter, librettist, actor and screenwriter. His birth name was Percival Davis, and he was also known as Clifford Gray.

Grey contributed prolifically to West End and Broadway shows, as librettist and lyricist for composers including Ivor Novello, Jerome Kern, Howard Talbot, Ivan Caryll and George Gershwin. Among his best-remembered songs are two from early in his career, in 1916: "If You Were the Only Girl (In the World)" and "Another Little Drink Wouldn't Do Us Any Harm". His later hits include "Got a Date with an Angel" and "Spread a Little Happiness".

For 35 years after 1979 it was widely believed that Grey secretly competed as an American bobsleigher, under the name Clifford "Tippy" Gray, in two Winter Olympics, in 1928 and 1932, winning gold medals, but it was finally shown that the sportsman was a different person.

Life and career

Early years
Grey was born in Birmingham, Warwickshire, the son of George Davis, a whip manufacturer, and his wife Emma, née Lowe. He was educated at the King Edward VI School. On leaving school in 1903 he had a variety of office jobs, in none of which he had any success. He became a pierrot with a local concert party, and adopted the stage name Clifford Grey, performing in pubs, piers and music halls. By the time he married in 1912 he had reduced his stage performing in favour of writing lyrics for West End shows. His wife was Dorothy Maud Mary Gould (1890 or 1891–1940), a fellow member of the concert party. They had two daughters, June and Dorothy; Grey also adopted Gould's daughter. Their marriage lasted until Dorothy's death.

In 1916 Grey had his big breakthrough as a writer, collaborating with the American composer Nat Ayer on The Bing Boys Are Here, a long-running revue that opened in London in April, and contained two of Grey's early successes, "If You Were the Only Girl (In the World)" and "Another Little Drink Wouldn't Do Us Any Harm". He collaborated with Ayer on Pell-Mell, The Bing Girls Are There, The Other Bing Boys, The Bing Brothers on Broadway, and Yes, Uncle! and with Herman Finck in Hallo, America!, Ivor Novello and Jerome Kern in Theodore & Co, Howard Talbot and Novello in Who's Hooper?, Novello in Arlette (1917) and Ivan Caryll in Kissing Time. On the last show he collaborated with P.G. Wodehouse, who was privately lukewarm about Grey's talent, regarding him as a specialist in adapting other people's work rather than as an original talent. At the same time, he acted in a dozen silent films, including The Crucible (1914), The Weakness of Strength (1916), Madame Cubist (1916), The Best Man (1917), Carnival (1921) and The Man from Home (1922).

1920s – Broadway and Hollywood
In 1920 Grey was invited to New York by Kern to renew their collaboration, writing Florenz Ziegfeld's Sally. Grey remained in the US for most of the decade, with occasional sorties back to London for Phi-Phi with Henri Christiné (1922), The Smith Family with Ayer (1922), and The Rainbow with George Gershwin (1923). For Broadway, he provided a regular stream of lyrics – and some libretti – for musical comedies and revues. His collaborators included Sigmund Romberg and Melville Gideon on some of the less-remembered shows, Ivan Caryll and Guy Bolton on The Hotel Mouse (1922), Vincent Youmans on Hit the Deck (1927), and Rudolph Friml and Wodehouse on The Three Musketeers (1928) and Ups-A-Daisy with Robert A. Simon for the Shubert Theatre (1928).

The introduction of talking pictures attracted Grey to Hollywood. He collaborated with Victor Schertzinger on the 1929 Maurice Chevalier and Jeanette MacDonald film, The Love Parade, and with Oscar Straus on The Smiling Lieutenant (1931), and contributed to films with a range of stars from Ramon Novarro to Lawrence Tibbett to Marion Davies. His songs and lyrics from shows were used in many films, and he wrote screenplays and lyrics for fourteen new Hollywood films between 1929 and 1931, including The Vagabond Lover (1929), In Gay Madrid (1930) and The Smiling Lieutenant (1931). After his death Grey's songs continued to be used in films and television productions. His best known song, "If You Were the Only Girl (in the World)", appeared in such films as Lilacs in the Spring (1954), The Bridge on the River Kwai (1957) and The Cat's Meow (2001), and some films, such as Hit the Deck (1955), were adaptations of his shows. In 1929, he returned temporarily to London, where he collaborated with Vivian Ellis on the musical Mr Cinders, which had a long West End run and featured one of Grey's best-remembered songs, "Spread a Little Happiness".

West End, films and last years
Returning to England in 1932, although apparently spending time in California, Grey concentrated thereafter on the West End stage and British films. His screenplay for Rome Express (1932), a spy story, was "extremely popular in its day and virtually created a subgenre". He wrote more than twenty screenplays for British films, usually for the popular comedians of the day, but also including My Song Goes Round the World (1934), Mimi (1935), an adaptation of La Bohème, for Gertrude Lawrence and Douglas Fairbanks Jr. and Yes, Madam? (1940).

Throughout the decade Grey had shows running in the West End, written in collaboration with previous collaborators and new ones including Oscar Levant, Johnny Green and Noel Gay. Grey wrote more than 3,000 songs.

When the Second World War began, Grey joined the Entertainments National Service Association (ENSA), which took shows round the country and overseas to provide relief for serving members of the armed forces. In 1941 he was presenting a concert party in Ipswich, Suffolk, when the town was heavily bombed. Grey died two days later, aged 54, as a result of a heart attack, brought on by the bombing, and exacerbated by asthma. He is buried in Ipswich Old Cemetery.

Olympian bobsleigher myth

After an article written in 1979 by an American journalist, Tim Clark, in Yankee Magazine, it was believed for more than three decades that Grey had competed, secretly, for the US Olympic bobsleigh team in 1928 and 1932 under the name Clifford "Tippy" (or "Tippi") Gray. Many news sources and biographers accepted this idea, based on circumstantial evidence that Clark had found. The evidence also persuaded Grey's daughters that their late father was not only the peripatetic writer that they remembered, but also a secret world-class sportsman who had been too modest to boast of his Olympic success. The press thereafter widely reported that Grey the librettist had also won a gold medal in the five-man bobsleigh race at the 1928 Winter Olympics in St. Moritz, another at the following Winter Olympics in Lake Placid, New York, this time in the four-man event, and a bronze medal in the four-man race at the 1937 FIBT World Championships in St. Moritz. In the Oxford Dictionary of National Biography the historian James Ross Moore concluded that during Grey's New York years:

There were a few who did not accept that "Tippi" Gray was the same person as Clifford Grey the writer. The Olympic historian David Wallechinsky was one, and John Cross, a researcher from Bowdoin College, was another. Finally, around 2013, Andy Bull, a sportswriter for The Guardian, was writing a book about the 1932 gold medal-winning bobsleigh team that was published in 2015 under the title Speed Kings. Although Bull had earlier accepted the story, as he looked closer, he became suspicious. He found an interview with "Tippy" Gray from 1948 in the Sarasota Herald-Tribune, seven years after Grey's death. "Tippy" Gray, the Olympic champion, died in April 1968 in San Diego, California. Bull wrote:

Films
Grey acted in a dozen silent films from 1914 to 1922, and later his lyrics, songs or screenplays were used in nearly 60 talking films:

1914 – The Crucible – Harry
1916 – The Weakness of Strength – Richard Grant
1916 –  Madame Cubist
1916 - A Wall Street Tragedy – Roy Simms
1916 – The Heart of a Hero – Tom Adams
1916 – A Coney Island Princess – Tony Graves
1917 – Alien Blood 
1917 – The Best Man 
1919 – The Game's Up – Ted Latham
1920 – The Cost – William Fanshaw Jr
1921 – Carnival – Lelio, Simonetta's brother
1921 – Dangerous Lies – Franklin Bond
1922 – The Man from Home – Secretary to  the king
1929 – Devil-May-Care – Songs
1929 – The Love Parade – Lyrics
1930 – Call of the Flesh – Songs
1930 – Madam Satan – Songs
1930 – The Florodora Girl – Songs
1931 – The Smiling Lieutenant – Lyrics
1932 – After the Ball – Lyricist
1932 – For the Love of Mike  – Script
1932 – Lord Babs – Adaptation, dialogue and lyrics
1932 – Rome Express – Original story and dialogue
1932 – The Midshipmaid – Lyrics
1932 – There Goes the Bride – Lyrics
1933 – Facing the Music – Original story
1933 – King of the Ritz – Lyricist
1933 – No Funny Business – Lyricist
1933 – Sleeping Car – Lyrics
1933 – Soldiers of the King – Lyrics
1933 – The Song You Gave Me – Script
1933 – This Is the Life – Script
1933 – You Made Me Love You – Songs (words and music)
1934 – Doctor's Orders – Script
1934 – Girls Will Be Boys – Scenario and dialogue

1934 – Give Her a Ring – Adaptation, scenario and dialogue
1934 – Love at Second Sight – Music and lyrics
1934 – Mr Cinders – Adaptation, scenario and dialogue
1934 – My Song Goes Round the World – Adaptation and scenario
1934 – The Luck of a Sailor – Script
1935 – Brewster's Millions – Adaptation
1935 – Charing Cross Road – Script
1935 – Dandy Dick – Adaptation, scenario and dialogue
1935 – Drake of England – Additional dialogue
1935 – Heart's Desire – Lyrics
1935 – Invitation to the Waltz – Scenario and additional dialogue
1935 – Me and Marlborough – Musical numbers
1935 – Mimi – Scenario and dialogue
1935 – The Student's Romance – Adaptation and scenario
1935 – Things Are Looking Up – Title song
1936 – Accused – Lyrics
1936 – Land without Music – Lyrics
1936 – Queen of Hearts – Original screenplay
1936 – Southern Roses – Lyrics
1937 – Boys Will Be Girls – Script
1937 – Pearls Bring Tears – Story
1937 – Sing as You Swing – Screen story
1937 – The Lilac Domino – Lyrics
1938 – Luck of the Navy – Script
1938 – Premiere – Lyricist
1938 – Yes, Madam? – Screenplay
1939 – An Englishman's Home – Screenplay
1939 – Lucky to Me – Screenplay
1939 – She Couldn't Say No – Script
1939 – The Lambeth Walk – Continuity and additional scenes
1940 – Band Waggon – Song: "The only one who's difficult is you"
1940 – The Middle Watch – Screenplay
1941 – My Wife's Family – Screenplay
1948 – Sleeping Car to Trieste – Original story
1954 – Hit the Deck – Lyrics

Notes, references and sources

Notes

References

Sources

External links
 
  (some acting roles are conflated with Clifford Gray)
 Clifford Grey recordings at the Discography of American Historical Recordings.

1887 births
1941 deaths
20th-century English male actors
English film score composers
English male film score composers
English lyricists
English male film actors
English male silent film actors
English male screenwriters
English songwriters
People educated at King Edward VI Camp Hill School for Boys
People from Birmingham, West Midlands
British expatriate male actors in the United States
20th-century English screenwriters
20th-century English male writers
20th-century British male musicians
British male songwriters
Broadway composers and lyricists